Teige is a surname. Notable people with the surname include:

 Karel Teige (1900–1951), Czech graphic artist, photographer, and typographer
 Lisa Teige (born 1998), Norwegian actress and dancer
 Thomas Teige (born 1968), German martial artist, multiple world champion and world record holder in powerbreaking, vice world champion in breaking, multiple European champion in kickboxing and occasional actor